Ilishan Remo is a town located within Irepodun district in Ikenne Local Government Area of Ogun State, South Western Nigeria.
Its ZIP code is 121103.

It's located within Latitude: 6.8932 East and Longitude: 3.7105 North in the Rainforest climatic region of the country.
Babcock University is situated in this town. 
Yoruba language is spoken at Ilishan-Remo, specifically the Ijebu dialect.
Birthplace of Chief Obafemi Awolowo;National Leader, UPN party
Birthplace of Philosopher Prof John Olubi Sodipo, Pioneer Vice-Chancelor, Ogun State University; Olabisi Onabanjo University

References

Populated places in Ogun State